Surya Man Gurung is a Nepalese politician, district president of the Nepali Congress in Taplejung District. He contested the 1999 legislative election in the Taplejung-1 constituency, but was defeated by the CPN(UML) candidate Til Kumar Menyangbo Limbu by a margin of 164 votes. Gurung is the NC candidate in the Taplejung-1 constituency for the 2008 Constituent Assembly election. He was declared a labour and employment minister by President Bidya Devi Bhandari on August 26, 2016

References

Living people
Nepali Congress politicians from Koshi Province
Year of birth missing (living people)
Gurung people
Members of the 1st Nepalese Constituent Assembly